List of motorcycles manufactured by Yamaha Motor Company.

First bikes

YA-1 built August 1954, produced January 1955. The first bike manufactured by Yamaha was actually a copy of the German DKW RT 125; it had an air-cooled, two-stroke, single cylinder 125 cc engine
YC-1 (1956) was the second bike manufactured by Yamaha; it was a 175 cc single cylinder two-stroke.
YD-1 (1957) Yamaha began production of its first 250 cc, two-stroke twin, the YD1.
MF-1 (1958) 50 cc, two-stroke, single cylinder, step through street bike
YDS-3 (1964) 246 cc, two-stroke, parallel-twin, it used the world's first oil injection lubrication system in a 2-stroke engine.
DT-1 (1968) Yamaha's first true off-road motorcycle.
XS-1 (1970) Yamaha's first four-stroke engine motorcycle (650 cc twin).
 Yamaha YZ Monocross (1975) First production motocross bike with a single rear shock.
 Yamaha YZ400F (1998) First mass-produced four-stroke motocross motorcycle.

Road bikes

Two-stroke

Four-stroke

Step-throughs, scooters, maxi-scooters (Two- and four-stroke)

Some of these step-throughs and scooters are made for Southeast Asian markets, where they are known as underbones.

Maxi-scooters (four-stroke)
Large scooters with more than 125 cc, and a large chassis and protection from the elements.

Motorcycles (racing)

Two-Stroke 

YD1
RD48
AS1
 YR1
 YR2
 YR3
 TA125
 TD1
 TD2
 TR2
 TR3
TZ50
TZ125
TZ250
 TZ350
 TZ500
 TZ700
 TZ750
 0W48R
 RD56
 Yz80
YZR500

Four-Stroke 

YZR-M1
0W01
YZE750T
YZE850T

Off-road bikes

Trail bike (road oriented)

Two-stroke

Four-stroke

Trail bike (dirt oriented)

Two-stroke

Four-stroke

Enduro

Two-stroke

Four-stroke

Trials

Motocross

Two-stroke

Four-stroke

Recreational

Two-stroke
PW50
PW80

Four-stroke
TTR50
TTR80
TTR90
TTR110
TTR125
TTR230

Tilting three-wheeled motor scooter 
 Yamaha Tricity

Electric motorcycles and scooters

Concept/prototype motorcycles

References

Yamaha